Reinhardt Mills, later Boris Kroll Mills, is a historic silk mill complex located in Paterson, Passaic County, New Jersey, United States. Part of the complex has been redeveloped as the Paterson Commons apartments with future plans for additional redevelopment. The Philip's Academy Charter School opened a campus on the site in 2016. The building was added to the National Register of Historic Places on May 9, 2003.

See also
National Register of Historic Places listings in Passaic County, New Jersey

External links 
 Paterson Commons
 PACS Paterson

References

Buildings and structures in Paterson, New Jersey
Industrial buildings and structures on the National Register of Historic Places in New Jersey
National Register of Historic Places in Passaic County, New Jersey
New Jersey Register of Historic Places
Silk mills in the United States
Apartment buildings in New Jersey
Buildings and structures completed in 1925